Babol Kenar District is a district (bakhsh) in Babol County, Mazandaran Province, Iran. At the 2006 census, its population was 24,946, in 6,788 families.  The District has one city: Marzikola.  The District has two rural districts (dehestan): Babol Kenar Rural District and Deraz Kola Rural District.

References 

Babol County
Districts of Mazandaran Province